HMS St. Helena (K590) was a  of the United Kingdom that served during World War II. She originally was ordered by the United States Navy as the Tacoma-class patrol frigate USS Pasley (PF-86) and was transferred to the Royal Navy prior to completion. After the British returned her to the United States in 1946, she briefly carried the name USS St. Helena (PF-86).

Construction and acquisition
The ship, originally designated a "patrol gunboat," PG-194, was ordered by the United States Maritime Commission under a United States Navy contract as USS Pasley. She was reclassified as a "patrol frigate," PF-86, on 15 April 1943 and laid down by the Walsh-Kaiser Company at Providence, Rhode Island, on 22 September 1943. Intended for transfer to the United Kingdom, the ship was renamed St. Helena by the British prior to launching and was launched on 20 October 1943.

Service history
Transferred to the United Kingdom under Lend-Lease on 19 February 1944, the ship served in the Royal Navy as HMS St. Helena (K590) until decommissioned in 1945.

Disposal
The United Kingdom returned St. Helena to the U.S. Navy at Norfolk, Virginia, on 8 April 1946, and she temporarily was placed on the Naval Vessel Register as USS St. Helena (PF-86). Struck from the Naval Vessel Register on 19 June 1946, she was transferred for disposal on 1 April 1947 to the U.S. Maritime Commission, which sold her to the  Sun Shipbuilding and Drydock Company of Chester, Pennsylvania, on 1 July 1947 for scrapping. Her scrapping date was 28 October 1947.

References

Notes

Bibliography
 Navsource Online: Frigate Photo Archive HMS St. Helena (K 590) ex-Pasley ex-PF-86 ex-PG-194

1943 ships
Ships built in Providence, Rhode Island
Tacoma-class frigates
Colony-class frigates
World War II frigates and destroyer escorts of the United States
World War II frigates of the United Kingdom